The canton of Morlaix is an administrative division of the Finistère department, northwestern France. Its borders were modified at the French canton reorganisation which came into effect in March 2015. Its seat is in Morlaix.

It consists of the following communes:
 
Carantec
Henvic
Locquénolé
Morlaix
Pleyber-Christ
Plounéour-Ménez
Sainte-Sève
Saint-Martin-des-Champs
Saint-Thégonnec Loc-Eguiner
Taulé

References

Cantons of Finistère